Glenn Dominic Phillips (born 6 December 1996) is a New Zealand cricketer, born in South Africa, who represents the New Zealand national cricket team and plays for Otago domestically. He made his international debut for New Zealand in February 2017. In December 2015, he was named in New Zealand's squad for the 2016 Under-19 Cricket World Cup. In December 2017, his younger brother, Dale was named in New Zealand's squad for the 2018 Under-19 Cricket World Cup.

Domestic and franchise career
Phillips was born in South Africa and moved to New Zealand at the age of five. He made his List A debut on 24 January 2015 in the Ford Trophy.

Phillips made his Twenty20 debut on 4 December 2016 in the 2016–17 Super Smash against the Otago Volts, making 55 off 32 deliveries opening the batting. He was the highest run-scorer in the Super Smash, with 369 runs. He scored his first century (116 not out) in the final regular season match against Central Districts where the Stags won by Duckworth-Lewis. He became the second domestic player since Hamish Marshall to score centuries in all three forms of the game, with Phillips being the first to do so within a single domestic season.

He made his first-class debut on 6 March 2017 in the 2016–17 Plunket Shield season against Canterbury. In June 2018, he was awarded a contract with Auckland for the 2018–19 season.

Ahead of the 2018 Caribbean Premier League, he was named as one of five players to watch in the tournament. In June 2020, he was offered a contract by Auckland ahead of the 2020–21 domestic cricket season. In July 2020, he was named in the Jamaica Tallawahs squad for the 2020 Caribbean Premier League. In 2021 he played for Welsh Fire in the inaugural season of the Hundred. In August 2021, he was named in the Barbados Royals' squad for the 2021 Caribbean Premier League.

In February 2022, he was bought by the Sunrisers Hyderabad in the auction for the 2022 Indian Premier League tournament. In April 2022, Phillips was re-signed by Gloucestershire for the 2022 T20 Blast in England. In April 2022, Phillips signed to play for Otago for the 2022–23 domestic season in New Zealand. He joined younger brother Dale at Otago and stated his desire to become a genuine all-rounder under coach Dion Ebrahim. As he secured a central New Zealand cricket contract in May 2022, his deal did not contribute to the Otago retainer salary bill.

International career
In February 2017, he was added to New Zealand's Twenty20 International (T20I) squad for their series against South Africa, after Martin Guptill was ruled out due to injury. He made his T20I debut for New Zealand against South Africa at Eden Park, Auckland on 17 February 2017.

In October 2017, he was named in New Zealand's One Day International (ODI) squad for their series against India. However, he did not play in that series. In December 2019, Phillips was added to New Zealand's Test squad for the third match against Australia, after Kane Williamson and Henry Nicholls were suffering with flu-like symptoms. He made his Test debut for New Zealand, against Australia, on 3 January 2020.

On 29 November 2020, in the second match against the West Indies, Phillips scored his first century in T20I cricket. It was also scored the fastest century by a New Zealand batsman in a T20I match, coming from 46 balls.

In May 2021, Phillips was awarded with his first central contract by New Zealand Cricket, ahead of the 2021–22 season. In August 2021, Phillips was named in New Zealand's squad for the 2021 ICC Men's T20 World Cup.

In June 2022, Phillips was named in New Zealand's ODI squads for their tours of Ireland and Scotland. He made his ODI debut on 10 July 2022, for New Zealand against Ireland.       On 29 October 2022,Phillips hit his second T20 century v Sri Lanka at the 2022 T20 World Cup in Australia

References

External links
 

1996 births
Living people
Auckland cricketers
Cricketers from East London, Eastern Cape
Gloucestershire cricketers
Naturalised citizens of New Zealand
New Zealand cricketers
New Zealand Test cricketers
New Zealand One Day International cricketers
New Zealand Twenty20 International cricketers
South African emigrants to New Zealand
Welsh Fire cricketers
Wicket-keepers